María Teresa Torró Flor (born 2 May 1992) is a Spanish former professional tennis player.

In her career, Torró Flor won one singles title and three doubles titles on the WTA Tour, as well as 18 singles and five doubles titles on the ITF Women's Circuit. On 5 May 2014, she reached her career-high singles ranking of world No. 47. On 8 June 2015, she peaked at No. 47 in the doubles rankings.

Torró Flor was victorious upon her debut for the Spain Fed Cup team in February 2013, defeating Ukraine's Yuliya Beygelzimer in their 2013 Fed Cup World Group II tie.

Biography
María Teresa Torró Flor was born on 2 May 1992 to Francisco Torró, an engineer, and Marita Teresa Flor, a teacher. She has one sister, Ana. She started playing tennis at the age of 4. Her favorite shot is her forehand; her favorite surface is clay. Her tennis idol growing up was Juan Carlos Ferrero; her favorite singer is Rihanna, and her favorite actor is Leonardo DiCaprio. She enjoys listening to music, reading, watching movies, and soccer. She has a dog named Greta.

Career

2012
Torró Flor began her 2012 season by playing a $25k tournament in Andrézieux-Bouthéon, France, where she lost in the first round of qualifying to Garbiñe Muguruza. She remained in France to play one more $25k event in Grenoble, for which she qualified. In the first round of the main draw, she overcame fellow qualifier and home favorite Jessica Ginier, only to be swept aside by fifth seeded Sandra Záhlavová in the second round.

Torró Flor then played her third consecutive $25k tournament in Rabat. She once more qualified, and defeated Cristina Dinu and Laura Thorpe en route to the quarterfinals where she lost to Jasmina Tinjić.

2014

Torró Flor missed the Shenzhen Open and the Australian Open due to a left leg injury.

She returned from injury in February at the Open GdF Suez in Paris. She lost in the first round of qualifying to Nadia Petrova. During the Fed Cup tie against the Czech Republic, Torró Flor played one rubber and lost to Klára Zakopalová. The Czech Republic ended up winning 3–2 over Spain to advance to the semifinal round. Seeded sixth at the first edition of the Rio Open, Torró Flor was defeated in the first round by qualifier Nastassja Burnett. Next, she played at the Brasil Tennis Cup. Seeded seventh, Torró Flor lost in the first round to Brazilian Teliana Pereira. In March, Torró Flor played at the Indian Wells Open. She won her first-round match when her opponent, Galina Voskoboeva, retired due to an upper respiratory infection. In the second round, she stunned fifth seed Angelique Kerber to earn her first career win over a top ten player. She was defeated in the third round by Alisa Kleybanova. At the Miami Open, Torró Flor lost in the first round to Andrea Petkovic. In April, Torró Flor played in the Fed Cup tie versus Poland. She won her first rubber over Urszula Radwańska but then lost her second rubber to Agnieszka Radwańska. Poland ended up winning 3–2.

Torró Flor began her clay-court season at the Morocco Open. She reached her first WTA final defeating fourth seed Bojana Jovanovski, qualifier Lara Arruabarrena, Polona Hercog, and fifth seed Garbiñe Muguruza. In the final, she beat Romina Oprandi to win her first WTA singles title. After this win, she broke into the world's top 50 for the first time in her career. At the Portugal Open, Torró Flor was defeated in the second round by seventh seed and eventual finalist, Svetlana Kuznetsova. At the Madrid Open, Torró Flor lost in the first round to Anastasia Pavlyuchenkova. At the Italian Open, Torró Flor was defeated in the first round of qualifying by Mona Barthel. She played at the Internationaux de Strasbourg and lost in the first round to Madison Keys. At the French Open, she beat 30th seed Klára Koukalová and Magdaléna Rybáriková in her first two rounds but was defeated in the third round by fourth seed and eventual finalist, Simona Halep.

Starting her grass-court season at the Rosmalen Open, Torró Flor lost in the first round to eighth seed Klára Koukalová. At the Wimbledon Championships, she was defeated in the first round by 30th seed, former world No. 1, and five-time Wimbledon champion, Venus Williams.

Grand Slam singles performance timeline

WTA career finals

Singles: 1 (title)

Doubles: 4 (3 titles, 1 runner–up)

ITF finals

Singles: 22 (18 titles, 4 runner–ups)

Doubles: 6 (5 titles, 1 runner–up)

Fed Cup participation

Singles

Doubles

Junior Grand Slam finals

Girls' doubles: 1 (runner–up)

Top-10 wins

Notes

References

External links

 
 
 

1992 births
Living people
People from Alto Vinalopó
Sportspeople from the Province of Alicante
Spanish female tennis players
Tennis players from the Valencian Community